The Judge Advocate of New South Wales, also referred to as the Deputy Judge Advocate was a ranking judicial officer in the Colony of New South Wales until the abolition of the role in 1823.

Before the First Fleet sailed from England to colonise New South Wales, Marine Captain David Collins was appointed Deputy Judge Advocate of the colony, and Judge Advocate of the marines.

The Judge Advocate held office in several courts. 
He was one of a bench of two justices of the peace in the Magistrates' Court.
He was president of the Court of Criminal Jurisdiction.
He was one of a bench of three judges in the Court of Civil Jurisdiction until its abolition in 1814.
In the Court of Appeal of New South Wales, he was advisor to the colony's Governor, who was the sole appeal judge.
From 1814,
He was assessor of the High Court of Appeal of New South Wales.
He was one of a bench of three magistrates in the Governors Court.

David Collins held office from 1788 until 1796. He was temporarily replaced by Richard Bowyer Atkins until Richard Dore arrived in 1798.
Dore was the first judge-advocate with legal qualifications. He died in 1800. Atkins was re-appointed and held office until late 1809, although he was temporarily deposed during the Rum Rebellion of 1808.

At the end of 1809, Ellis Bent, a barrister, arrived from England to take up the appointment as judge-advocate. He held the office until his death on 10 November 1815.

List of Judge Advocates

Notes

References

New South Wales law
Australian penal colony administrators